Erin McKinnon (born 15 December 1998) is an Australian rules footballer playing for St Kilda in the AFL Women's competition (AFLW). She previously played for Greater Western Sydney.

AFLW career
McKinnon was drafted by Greater Western Sydney with the club's sixth selection and the forty eighth overall in the 2016 AFL Women's draft. She made her debut in Round 1, 2017, in the club's inaugural match against  at Thebarton Oval.

In June 2022, after requesting to leave Greater Western Sydney, she was traded to St Kilda.

References

External links

Living people
1998 births
Greater Western Sydney Giants (AFLW) players
Sportswomen from New South Wales
Australian rules footballers from Sydney
All-Australians (AFL Women's)